"The Fat Blue Line" is the third episode of the thirty-first season of the American animated television series The Simpsons, and the 665th episode overall. It aired in the United States on Fox on October 13, 2019. The writer was Bill Odenkirk. The title is a pun of the law enforcement phrase The Thin Blue Line.

Plot
The Simpson family goes to the San Castellaneta street festival, dedicated to the Italian culture, while Fat Tony meets with his uncle. Mayor Quimby introduces Jason Momoa who tells the story of Ignatius Castellaneta.

At the gathering of money for Jesus, the people at the festival were robbed. At the Police Station, Lenora Carter takes the case in hand, diminishing Chief Wiggum's job. As bait for the robber, Homer is taken, due to this big butt being the biggest in town, setting a wallet with a tracking device in his pocket.

After Homer is pickpocketed in the underground, the police follow the device to storage full of wallets when a door opens and Fat Tony and his uncle get framed being the culprit while Wiggum is depressed due to being put aside on the case.

At the Springfield Penitentiary (Sideshow Bob escapes from it but gets hit by a rake truck), Fat Tony prays to God to help him out of it while Wiggum on the other side prays to God to help him in his own situation, and Homer prays him to bring back plastic straws.

Louie brings in his lawyer, who constantly gets him out of guilty crimes, But upon hearing he's innocent, he leaves while Wiggum watches an interview with Tony saying he'll never commit the pickpocket crime, so he goes to his jail and says to Tony he'll get him out if he convinces him he's innocent.

Tony shows him what he does every day at the time of the crime, singing in his room alone. Tony agrees to put on a wire and goes to Luigi's to find out who framed him. Frankie the Squealer reveals to him it was Johnny Tightlips who betrayed him and become the Springfield Mafia boss. Homer enters the room by mistake when police intervene on the scene and is hit by a bullet in the butt. Wiggum sucks it out. At the Springfield General Hospital, Homer wakes up safe. At the station, Wiggum regains his confidence.

In the end, Fat Tony, Homer, and Wiggum share a toast on the successful operation at Giuseppe's.

Reception
Dennis Perkins of The A.V. Club gave the episode a B− stating, "Now, 'The Fat Blue Line' isn't one of those rare gems, sadly, but it's certainly possessed of some unalloyed warmth and affection for the characters and the subject matter thanks to one of the Simpsons vets whose name in the credits can at least guarantee an episode a decent shot, Bill Odenkirk. Odenkirk's scripts, as a rule eschew gimmickry and deadening self-referential exhaustion in favor of a stubborn professionalism. If this particular tale of Fat Tony being framed as Springfield's number one pickpocket (as opposed to being definitely guilty of being Springfield’s number one every other kind of crook) never rises above a sort of cozy familiarity, it at least earns its place as a Simpsons episode that seems to remember that The Simpsons is worth remembering."

Tony Sokol of Den of Geek rated this episode 4 out of 5 stars.

References

External links

2019 American television episodes
The Simpsons (season 31) episodes
Television episodes about crime